Albert Louis Corey (16 April 1878 – 3 August 1926) was a French athlete who competed at the 1904 Summer Olympics held in St. Louis, Missouri, United States. He won a silver medal in the marathon race and also won a silver medal as a member of the Chicago Athletic Association team in the four mile team race.

Biography
The Games report refers to Corey as a "Frenchman wearing the colors of the Chicago Athletic Association". Corey was a French immigrant to the United States, who lived in America and did not have the right papers. Previously the International Olympic Committee listed him as an American, due to insufficient or improper documentation at the time. Currently IOC attributes his medal in the marathon to France and the medal in the team race to a mixed team, not to the United States. In 2021, its identity is re-established by the Olympic Studies Centre, a division of the IOC. In May 2021, following a book about Albert Corey, the IOC officially recognizes the medal of the athlete to the male Marathon to the Olympic Games of 1904 as French.

Competing for the First Regiment Athletic Association of Chicago on June 6, 1908, Corey finished ahead of Roy Kemper and teammate Alexander Thibeau to win the 15-mile St. Louis Marathon.

References
   .
   .

External links

1878 births
1926 deaths
American male long-distance runners
American male marathon runners
French male long-distance runners
Olympic silver medalists for France
Athletes (track and field) at the 1904 Summer Olympics
Olympic athletes of France
Medalists at the 1904 Summer Olympics
French expatriate sportspeople in the United States
Olympic silver medalists in athletics (track and field)